This is a list of professional wrestlers who are currently competing in Pro Wrestling Zero1, a Japanese professional wrestling promotion. Through a relationship with the Marvelous That's Women Pro Wrestling joshi puroresu promotion, Zero1 also has a division for female wrestlers. This list contains signed wrestlers as well as freelancers which make sporadic appearances for the promotion.

Roster

Heavyweight wrestlers

Junior heavyweight wrestlers

Female wrestlers

Other personnel

Corporate

Notable alumni/guests

Male

 Akebono
 Alexander Otsuka
 "brother" Yasshi
 Craig Classic
 CW Anderson
 Daichi Hashimoto
 Daisuke Sekimoto
 Damian Slater
 Drew Parker
 Gerard Gordeau 
 Hideki Suzuki
 Hirotaka Yokoi
 HUB
 James Raideen
 Jason Lee
 Jon Heidenreich
 Jonathan Gresham
 Kai
 Kamikaze
 Katsuhisa Fujii
 Kazuhiko Ogasawara
 Kazunari Murakami
 Keiji Sakoda
 King Joe / Samoa Joe
 Leonardo Spanky
 Low Ki
 Manabu Nakanishi
 Masakatsu Funaki
 Matt Ghaffari
 Maximum Capacity
 Mineo Fujita
 Minoru Fujita
 Naohiro Hoshikawa
 Naoya Ogawa
 Nathan Jones
 The Predator
 Robbie Eagles
 Ryoji Sai
 Ryota Nakatsu
 Shinya Hashimoto
 Skulu
 Sonjay Dutt
 Sterling James Keenan
 Steve Corino
 Takao Omori
 Tank Nagai
 Tom Howard
 Toshiaki Kawada
 Tsuyoshi Kikuchi
 Wataru Sakata
 Yoshiaki Fujiwara
 Yoshihiro Takayama
 Yuji Nagata
 Yusaku Obata
 Zeus

Female

 Akane Fujita
 Aoi Kizuki
 Ayame Sasamura
 Giulia
 Kaoru Ito
 Mochi Miyagi
 Ram Kaicho
 Rina Shingaki
 Yuhi

See also
List of professional wrestlers

External links 
 Official roster page

References 

Lists of professional wrestling personnel
Pro Wrestling Zero1